Floyd Lucian Brown (born March 28, 1888) was an American college football player and coach. He served as the head football coach at Lombard College in Galesburg, Illinois from 1914 to 1915 and Lake Forest College in Lake Forest, Illinois from 1924 to 1928.

Head coaching record

College football

References

1888 births
Year of death missing
American football tackles
Basketball coaches from Ohio
Lombard Olive football coaches
Lake Forest Foresters football coaches
Lake Forest Foresters men's basketball coaches
Ohio Bobcats football players
High school football coaches in Connecticut
People from Adams County, Ohio